The JEATH War Museum is a war museum in Kanchanaburi, Thailand about the Death Railway built from 1942 to 1943 by Allied POWs under the direction of the Japanese, a part of the Thai-Burma railways.

Founding
The museum was founded in 1977 by the chief abbot of Wat Chaichumpol Venerable  Phra Theppanyasuthee. It is located on the grounds of a temple at the junction of the Khwae Yai and Khwae Noi rivers in Kanchanaburi and it is a part of the famous The Bridge over the River Kwai saga.

JEATH
The acronym JEATH stands for the primary nationalities involved in the construction of the railway: Japanese, English, Australian, American, Thai and Holland, whereas the Thai name is Phíphítháphan Songkhram Wát Tâi (Wat Tai War Museum).

The museum
The museum is divided into two sections, one depicting the construction of the Death Railway which is meant to recreate the quarters used by Allied POWs, and the other consisting of reconstructed bamboo huts containing such items as paintings, drawings and photos of and by former prisoners, weapons, tools, and maps.

Tourist photos are not permitted in Section I of the museum.

Gallery

See also
 Kanchanaburi War Cemetery
 Thailand–Burma Railway Centre
Thanbyuzayat War Cemetery in Myanmar

References

External links

 Webpage about the museum

Kanchanaburi
World War II museums
Military history of Thailand
Museums established in 1977
History museums in Thailand
Military and war museums in Thailand
Buildings and structures in Kanchanaburi province
Tourist attractions in Kanchanaburi province
1977 establishments in Thailand
Burma Railway